Ambikapur may refer to:

Ambikapur, Bangladesh
Ambikapur, India